Michael R. Garcia (born May 11, 1968) is a retired professional baseball pitcher. He played parts of two seasons in Major League Baseball for the Pittsburgh Pirates. He also played in Mexico, Taiwan, and Korea.

Mike Garcia played at John W. North High School in Riverside, CA and was drafted in the 7th round of the 1986 amateur draft by the Boston Red Sox. He then played at Riverside City College (RCC) and was drafted by the Detroit Tigers in the 55th round of the 1989 amateur draft.

In 1997 Mike Garcia became the first American-born player to be named the Chinese Professional Baseball League MVP.  He won the award again in 2004.

On September 10, 1999 Mike Garcia made his MLB debut for the Pittsburgh Pirates. He played at the Triple-A level for the Pittsburgh Pirates, Baltimore Orioles, and the Chicago Cubs. He finished his career with the Road Warriors of the Atlantic League of Professional Baseball in 

Mike Garcia was an Area Scout for the Philadelphia Phillies until 2020, signing Mickey Moniak (2016).

In 2021, Mike Garcia joined the staff of the Rocky Mountain Vibes of the Pioneer League, as their pitching coach.

References

External links

Career statistics and player information from Korea Baseball Organization

1968 births
Altoona Curve players
American expatriate baseball players in Canada
American expatriate baseball players in Mexico
American expatriate baseball players in South Korea
American expatriate baseball players in Taiwan
Atlantic League Road Warriors players
Baseball players from Riverside, California
Bristol Tigers players
Diablos Rojos del México players
Fayetteville Generals players
Iowa Cubs players
KBO League pitchers
Lakeland Tigers players
Leones de Yucatán players
Living people
London Tigers players
Major League Baseball pitchers
Mexican League baseball pitchers
Nashville Sounds players
Niagara Falls Rapids players
Olmecas de Tabasco players
Ottawa Lynx players
Pittsburgh Pirates players
Riverside City Tigers baseball players
Rochester Aces players
Rochester Red Wings players
Samsung Lions players
Saraperos de Saltillo players